Dobrinka is a rural locality (a stanitsa) and the administrative center of Dobrinskoye Rural Settlement, Uryupinsky District, Volgograd Oblast, Russia. The population was 1,883 as of 2010. There are 19 streets.

Geography 
Dobrinka is located in forest steppe, 19 km southeast of Uryupinsk (the district's administrative centre) by road. Gorsko-Popovsky is the nearest rural locality.

References 

Rural localities in Uryupinsky District